Lucky's Tale is a 3D platform game developed and published by American studio Playful Studios and released in 2016 as a launch title and pack-in game for the Oculus Rift virtual reality headset. A sequel without VR support titled Super Lucky's Tale was released worldwide in November 2017. A remastered version of the game was released for Oculus Quest 2 and non-Oculus PCVR headsets via Steam in 2021, featuring improvements to the game's graphics, audio and movement, as well as replacing Lucky's character model with the one from New Super Lucky's Tale. A PlayStation VR version was released on April 7, 2022.

Reception

Lucky's Tale received "mixed or average" reviews, according to review aggregator Metacritic.

In a review for Game Informer, Andrew Reiner criticized the variety of the game, writing "Leaping across lily pads and tail-whacking enemies becomes the routine for most of the stages, and the occasional boss fights and bomb-throwing sequences aren’t enough to spice up the action. Developer Playful Corp rarely detours from the basics. By the third level, I felt the action was in desperate need of variety." He also disliked how the game made the player replay levels in order to progress. "In order to reach new levels, Lucky must first collect a specific number of Paws. A Paw is rewarded for finishing a level, but that isn’t always enough. To earn more Paws, the player must reenter the levels to complete time trials or red-coin challenges. If the level was boring the first time (which many of them are), replaying it feels like a chore."

Destructoid's Chris Carter praised the sense of presence virtual reality brought to the game. "I appreciate the fact that I can just tilt my head ever so slightly to look around for threats rather than move an analog stick, and it truly does add to the experience." He additionally criticized the comfort of the game, "There were a few sections of discomfort, though, mostly involving backtracking. Like a lot of other 3D mascot platformers, the camerawork isn’t perfect, and in some cases, I’d have to almost look directly down or hold my neck at an angle that wasn’t ideal to get back to a desired area. It’s not the end of the world, but it’s a clear cut indication of where VR can improve."

References

External links

2016 video games
3D platform games
Indie video games
Single-player video games
Windows games
Oculus Rift games
Windows-only games
Video games about foxes
Video games developed in the United States
Virtual reality games